Andrew J. Duck (born October 31, 1962) is an American politician and a perennial candidate. He was most recently the Democratic candidate for the United States House of Representatives for Maryland's 6th congressional district in the 2018 general election. He was a candidate for the same seat in 2006, 2008, and 2010, winning the Democratic nomination in 2006 but losing in the 2008 Democratic primary to Jennifer Dougherty. On June 1, 2009, he announced his intention to run for the seat again in 2010.  Duck defeated Casey Clark in the Democratic primary but lost the general election to incumbent Roscoe Bartlett.

Biography

Duck is the 15th of 17 children. He is a graduate of Middletown High School in Middletown, Maryland, in 1979 and earned a bachelor's degree in public administration from Southwest Texas State University. He married Whitney Duck in 1981, and the couple has three children.

Military career
Duck became a member of the U.S. Army, beginning as a private first class, working as a company clerk. He worked his way up to administrative non-commissioned officer, was trained as a Korean linguist, and was commissioned as a Military Intelligence officer.

Duck's military assignments include commander of D Company in the 103rd Military Intelligence Battalion, leading the Joint STARS Platoon and working with the 103rd Military Intelligence Battalion in Bosnia. He was also an intelligence liaison officer to the 1st Marine Expeditionary Force in Iraq, and an intelligence staff officer with the Coalition Forces Land Component Command in Kuwait.

Private career
Duck has also worked as a stockbroker for Merrill Lynch in Frederick, Maryland. He is currently the Director of Operations at Avertica. He is now retired from Northrop Grumman where he served as an advisor to The Pentagon on Army Intelligence issues.

Political career
Duck was a staff member on the 1980 Carter/Mondale Presidential Committee. Most recently, he has become a member of Citizens for Responsible Growth in New Market, Maryland, and co-founder of Frederick for Kerry in 2004, which promoted the presidential campaign of John Kerry in Frederick, Maryland.

2006 campaign
In his 2006 campaign against long-serving Republican Representative Roscoe Bartlett, Duck was widely perceived as a longshot. He enjoyed some partisan support as evidenced by the endorsements by several statewide and regional Democrats, including Senator Barbara Mikulski, Congressman Chris Van Hollen, and two former mayors of Frederick, Ron Young and Jennifer Dougherty. He also received support from several organized labor groups, including the Maryland-D.C. AFL-CIO, the Maryland State Teacher's Association and the National Education Association.

Duck claimed to support "restoring fiscal responsibility to Washington" by eliminating "the culture of corruption and fraud, (reexamining) current spending to match current priorities, and (rolling) back the tax cut for the top two percent of Americans". His infrastructure platform called for ensuring that Maryland can "support water, sewer, transportation and education" while preserving "open spaces... rural heritage (and) affordable housing". On education, he supports increased funding and claims that the No Child Left Behind Act has been a failure due to underfunding and a lack of flexibility. He was an advocate of gun ownership restrictions and sought to reduce gun violence by closing the gun show loophole, providing universal health care, including mental health care, and promoting the registration of weapons and a law enforcement focus on violent criminals and anti-gang initiatives. He supported energy independence, believing it can be achieved in 10 years; his proposals included "re-engineering federal buildings to reduce government energy consumption", raising Corporate Average Fuel Economy standards, increasing funding for mass transit, requiring disclosure of home energy costs and offering tax "incentives for energy conservation and (the) use of mass transit." He opposed partially privatizing Social Security. He also advocated federal legislation to change bankruptcy protection so that individuals' retirement is "safe and secure". He supported universal health care and environmental protection, which he claimed was rolled back by the George W. Bush Administration. Specifically, on the environment, he supported the Clean Air Act and Clean Water Act and opposed drilling in the Arctic National Wildlife Refuge; he believed that the Healthy Forests Initiative and the Clear Skies Act have a negative impact on the environment. Though his website does not cover the issue, Duck has been described as supporting civil unions as the first step towards marriages equality, and supports equal rights for the LGBTQ community.

Duck's website did not cover his position on abortion. However, he has been described personally pro-life, but believes the choice is ultimately up the women who is carrying the child to make that decision. 
As a veteran of the Iraq War, he claimed to be proud of his service in that country and felt that the war effort has been bungled. He believed that American forces "continue to do an outstanding job" in physical battles. However, he claimed, their efforts will be in vain if new enemies replace old ones due to Iraqi opposition to and dissatisfaction with the American occupation. He referred to this struggle as a "Battle of Ideas". His personal "roadmap to victory" in Iraq included providing adequate resources for the troops in that country, both in the number of soldiers and their equipment, training Iraqi forces, and recruiting additional allies from Europe. He was opposed to a timetable for exit from Iraq. Duck believed the United States can win the "Battle of Ideas" in Iraq by internationalizing the war effort with increasing support from European allies, investigating and prosecuting all guilty parties in detainee abuse incidents such as at Abu Ghraib, evaluating actions "to determine the impact on insurgent recruiting," and closing Guantanamo Bay and prosecuting any terrorists held there in federal courts, and holding wartime combatants in the countries they fought. His long-term goals in the Muslim world included promoting "public engagement" between American and Muslim leaders, democracy "in whatever form is acceptable to (Muslims)," Fair Trade and economic development, and literacy "throughout the Middle East." He also considered his plan for energy independence within 10 years to be a part of his Middle East strategy. Duck pointed to one event as a major reason for his criticism of the Bush administration's war strategy, the canceling of elections in an-Najaf on orders from the administration, because, he noted, "they didn't want to accept the results of the election".

Duck's campaign focused on his military service, especially after he began working with the Band of Brothers, an organization of veterans and Democratic candidates. He used military metaphors to enforce this image, which he counts as a "key weapon" in his campaign against Bartlett. Independent observers claimed that his military experience would help in the election by countering the argument that Democrats are "soft on terrorism"; however, this was not a large enough aid in the election. Bartlett won his 2004 re-election campaign, which was also against a veteran, with 68% of the vote. However, Duck hoped that he would win the votes of Republicans and independents unhappy with the Bush Administration's deficient war spending and that this would be enough to bring him victory in the election. He pointed to conservative dissatisfaction with Republican leadership, which has created "the biggest government we've ever had, the most intrusive government we've ever had and the most fiscally irresponsible government that we've ever had".

Duck and Bartlett held very similar views on many topics, including their support of energy independence and opposition to drilling in the Arctic National Wildlife Refuge. Duck, however, criticized his opponent on at least one specific issue, a vote "against providing sufficient funds for veterans' medical care".

Duck's campaign funding totaled a little bit over $100,000, of which more than $75,000 dollars has come from individuals, $15,000 from PACs and under $10,000 from the candidate's own funds. His PAC funding, according to The Washington Post, fell entirely into the "ideology/single issue section," while his individual contributions came primarily from the "Lawyers/Lobbyists" and "Other" categories. His top five contributors, each of which have donated more than $500 to his campaign, were the Iraq and Afghanistan Veterans of America, Retail Services & Systems, Universal Title, Glenwillow Inc., and Global Crossing. He received most of his contributions from people in Westminster, Frederick, Potomac, Baltimore and Ijamsville. All of his contributions were from in-state sources, and the majority were from industries classified as "Lawyers/Law Firms," "Retired," "Misc. Issues," and "Real Estate". OpenSecrets.org describes Duck's biggest sources of funding as including "Industrial Unions", "Lawyers/Law Firms", "Retired", "Misc Issues", "Leadership PACs" and "Real Estate", and describes more of his funding as coming from "Labor" rather than "Ideological' sources.

The Washington Times stated that Maryland's 6th district is the state's most reliably Republican and that Duck was not regarded as a serious threat to the incumbent.

Duck lost the election to Bartlett on November 7, 2006. He received 39% of the vote, while Bartlett received 59%.

2008 campaign 
Duck announced that he would challenge Congressman Bartlett again in 2008.

Duck was defeated in the Potomac Primary on February 12, 2008, by former Frederick mayor Jennifer Dougherty with 44% to Duck's 37%, the remaining votes split between three other candidates. Dougherty went on to lose in the general election to incumbent Republican Roscoe Bartlett.

2010 campaign 
Duck challenged Congressman Bartlett in the 2010 election. He defeated former TV newsman Casey Clark, in the Democratic Primary. While Duck did not succeed in defeating Bartlett in the election, his efforts increased registered Democrats in the district by 9%. This effort lead to the district to go from a Republican leaning district, into a Democratic leaning district. He was then succeeded by John Delaney in 2012.

2018 campaign 
Duck ran as a Democrat for the Maryland 6th congressional district race in 2018. He was one of six potential candidates.

Duck filed to run for Congress on June, 8th 2017 He has stated he decided to run after the election of Donald J. Trump. Since the election of Trump, he has been active in various local events and movements.

Love Trumps Hate Rally 
After the 2016 Election, Duck had seen various individuals in his local area shocked at the turn of the events. Spurned by the vitriol and rhetoric given by President-Elect Trump during the campaign, Duck sought to give comfort to those still reeling from the election. He created a gathering in Baker Park in downtown Frederick, MD. Over 200 people had attended the event, and on short notice.

Frederick Cares 

After the Love Trumps Hate Rally in Bakers Park, Duck sought to keep the message of caring for our community going with the people. Doing this, he helped found Frederick Cares. The organization continues to work, trying to enact positive social change in the Frederick County area and beyond. This organization has been active in not only reaching out to under represented minority groups, but as well as reaching across the aisle to conservative voters. They provided buses to the Women's March in DC in 2017. Andrew assisted in getting people to the march and organizing buses to take them there.

Our Revolution Western Maryland 

Duck was an organizer for Our Revolution Western Maryland. He has worked hard for advocacy after the 2016 Presidential election, and continues to be active in the organization. Our Revolution Western Maryland has now reached out into the area, and has even brought in speakers such as candidate for Governor Ben Jealous, and author Nina Turner.

Speeches 

Duck has been active in the area, often giving speeches at events to encourage discourse and to motivate voters to action. He was active in the No Potomac Pipeline in Hancock, Maryland. He testified to the MDE panel, highlighting its effects and stated ”This pipeline has no permanent benefit to the state of Maryland.”

Duck also marched in a local Women's March in Cumberland, Maryland. During that march, he marched with several women, and spoke directly to the crowd to encourage voter turn out. “We have people here from all walks of life and all political stripes who are tired of the division and hatred that we see in our system today,” said Duck. “We may have differences of opinion but it doesn’t mean we can’t talk to each other.  We have been taking action to show that love is greater than hate, caring is greater than divisions. We need to show that compassion is an American value.” Duck continues to encourage dialogue and compassion into the community.

Duck, Director of Operations of a Green Energy company called Avertica has often spoken out about Climate Change and renewable energy. He marched in a Climate Change March in Cumberland, Maryland. Citing his experience at Avertica, he has pushed for expansion of more green energy, and the growth of jobs in the new energy markets that will come.

See also

References

Bibliography

External links 
 

1962 births
Living people
United States Army officers
United States Army personnel of the Iraq War
People from Brunswick, Maryland
University of Oklahoma alumni
Texas State University alumni
Maryland Democrats
Candidates in the 2006 United States elections
Candidates in the 2010 United States elections
21st-century American politicians